Warren Charles McSkimming (born 21 June 1979, Ranfurly, Otago) is a former cricketer from New Zealand, who represented the Otago cricket team in the Plunket Shield first-class competition, the Ford Trophy domestic one-day competition and the Burger King Super Smash T20 competition.

McSkimming, a fast bowler and useful lower order batsman, was selected in the 30-man preliminary New Zealand squad for the Champions Trophy 2006 alongside Otago team-mates Nathan McCullum and Bradley Scott.

See also
 List of Otago representative cricketers

External links
 

New Zealand cricketers
Otago cricketers
People from Ranfurly, New Zealand
1979 births
Living people
South Island cricketers